Liberty Corner is an unincorporated community located in Bernards Township, in Somerset County, New Jersey. Liberty Corner is about 3.75 miles (6 km) south of Bernardsville. Liberty Corner has a post office with ZIP code 07938. The Liberty Corner Historic District was listed on the state and national registers of historic places in 1991.

Demographics

History
In 1722, the area was known by its primary landholder, John Annin, as "Annin's Corner." This was changed to "Liberty Corner" during the American Revolution.

On August 29, 1781, the First Brigade of the French Army, the Expédition Particulière, under command of the French general Comte de Rochambeau, camped here by Bullion's Tavern, along the route to Yorktown, Virginia. The next day they marched to the campground at Somerset Courthouse, now Millstone. The American Continental Army marched nearby along different roads as part of this joint effort.

The Bonnie Brae School for boys was an orphanage in the area. It was founded in 1916 as a "working farm" for boys. in 2018 it accepts boys that have been emotionally maltreated.

Historic district

The Liberty Corner Historic District is a historic district in the village. The district was added to the National Register of Historic Places on October 11, 1991, for its significance in community development and architecture from 1865 to 1935.

Education
Liberty Corner Elementary is located here. It is the oldest school in the Bernards Township School District. It once instructed grades 1 through 8. In 2018, it taught 550 students in grades K-5.

Points of interest
 The United States Golf Association and the USGA Museum
 The Phareloch Castle of Liberty Corner

Gallery

Notable people
 The Kienast quintuplets lived here from just after their birth in 1970 to at least 1984
 William Henry Johnson, known as Zip the Pinhead was born here sometime before 1858.

References

External links
 T he Annan's - One of the first families and founders of Liberty Corner
 
 

Bernards Township, New Jersey
Unincorporated communities in Somerset County, New Jersey
Unincorporated communities in New Jersey
National Register of Historic Places in Somerset County, New Jersey
Historic districts on the National Register of Historic Places in New Jersey
New Jersey Register of Historic Places